Sayyid Ali Akbar was a Sunni Muslim saint, and according to some historians of genealogy the second son of Imam Hasan al-Askari, the eleventh Imam in Shia Islam. He was also the brother of the twelfth Imam Muhammad al-Mahdi. His existence was hidden because of contemporary political conflicts with the political leadership of the Abbasids, reaching its peak at that time.

Sayyid Ali Akbar is venerated in Sunni and Shiite sufi Islam as the patriarch of various Sufi Saints.

Introduction 
The genealogical records of some Middle Eastern families, especially from Persia and Khorasan, indicate that 11th imam had a second son, Sayyid Ali. This is supported by the belief of various followers of Sufi saints, like the sunni saints Moinuddin Chishti and Bahauddin Naqshband, who were the founders of the Chishtiyya and Naqshbandiyya sufi orders and also the prominent Sufi Saint Khwaja Maudood Chishti.

In his Usul al-Kafi, al-Kulayni wrote, "All confirms the claim that Hasan al-Askari had more than one wife, in addition to slave girls, with whom he had relations" and, "when the caliph received news of Imam Hasan al-Askari's illness, he instructed his agents to keep a constant watch over the house of the Imam... he sent some of these midwives to examine the slave girls of the Imam to determine if they were pregnant. If a woman was found pregnant she was detained and imprisoned."

Descendants 
According to the earliest reports as cited below from official family tree documents and records, Imam Hasan al-Askari fathered seven children and was survived by six.  The names of his illustrious biological children were: Imam Muhammad al-Mahdi, Musa, Ja’far, Ibrahim, Fatima and ‘Ali, sometimes referred to as al-Akbar, al-Asghar, al-Taqi, al-Muttaqi or al-Amir, Abu Abdullah.
Еarly books on sayyid genealogy also mention that the descendants of Sayyid Ali ibn Sayyid imam Hassan al-Askari lived in the city of Sabzevar in shiite muslims Iran.

Notable descendants of Sayyid Ali Akbar include the eleventh generation Sufi saints, Maudood Chishti  and Bahauddin Naqshband. One descendant after eighteen generations was Hazrat Ishaan. Maternal descendants of Sayyid Imam al-Askari and Hazrat Ishaan included the brothers, Sayyid Mir Jan, Sayyid Mahmud Agha and Sayyid Mir Fazlullah Agha, the Chief Justice of the Emirate of Afghanistan. And paternal descendant of Sayyid Imam Al-Askari Jamāl al-Dīn al-Afghānī also known as Sayyid Jamāl ad-Dīn Asadābādī and commonly known as Al-Afghani - a political activist and Islamic ideologist who travelled throughout the Muslim world during the late 19th century and Sayyid Mohammed Uthman al-Mirghani, known as "Al-Khatim", was the founder of the Khatmiyya sufi tariqa that has a following in Egypt, Sudan, Eritrea, Somalia and Ethiopia.

Annemarie Schimmel wrote, "Khwaja Mir Dard's family, like many nobles from Bukhara, led their pedigree back to Baha'uddin Naqshband, after whom the Naqshbandi order is named, and who was a descendant, in the eleventh generation of the eleventh Shia imam, Sayyid al-Hasan al-Askari."

Controverse 

There are some Shiite genealogists like Walid Al-Baaj, who describe that there were old genealogical sources, stating that Sultan Sadat Sayyid Ali Akbar was the second son of Sayyid imam Muhammad al-Askari who is considered the elder brother of imam Hasan al-Askari, and his descendants. Al-Baaj wrote a book about the descent of Ali Akbar from Muhammad ibn Ali al Hadi and not Hasan al Askari in 1999. 

His Royal Highness Prince Sayyid Raphael Dakik of Afghanistan, Grand Sayyid of the Qadiriyya wa Naqshbandiyya, Barakzai Prince and a well known Sunni descendant of Sayyid Ali Akbar through Bahauddin Naqshband explains that there might be another Ali being the son of Muhammad ibn Ali al Hadi, whom some people confused with Ali Akbar ibn Hasan al Askari. Besides he arguments that Khomeinists in their will to uphold Wilayat Faqih fear that people might know about the existence of a second son of Hasan Al Askari and for this purpose vehemently neglect and even destroy sources as otherwise the Khomeinist Iranian government would not have any legitimacy for dedicated Muslims anymore.

Harvard Professor Annemarie Schimmel highlights the descent of Bahauddin from Hasan al Askari through Sayyid Ali Akbar, referring to the Sunni noble Khwaja Mir Dard´s family and "many nobles, from Bukhara; they led their pedigree back to Baha`uddin Naqshband, after whom the Naqshbandi order is named, and who was a descendent, in the 13th generation of the 11th Shia imam al-Hasan al-Askari".

Burial place 

The genealogy of Khwaja Samandar Muhammad ibn Baqi al-Termizi - the famous sheikh and poet, writer and scholar, author of "Dastur al Mulk" (Guide to Kings) (XVII сentury), goes back to Sultan Sadat - Al-Amir Sayyid Ali Akbar Termizi - in turn Al-Amir Sayyid Ali Akbar bin Sayyid imam Al-Askari, it is mentioned in his history book called "Dastur al Mulk". The 15th century famous poet, musicologist, scholar of language and other sciences Sahib Balkhi Sharifi wrote about the Sayyids of Termiz. His one of the poems begins with the name of Sultan Saadat (Sultan of Sayyids), i.e. the praise of Al-Amir Sayyid Ali Akbar al Termizi. Therefore, Sultan Saadat (Sodot) is the Sultan of Sayyids and the owner (historians suggest that Sayyid Ali Akbar bin Sayyid imam Muhammad Al-Askari's burial place is located in the main mausoleum Sultan Saodat memorial complex) "Sultan Saodat (Sadat)" Mausoleum (erected 9-15 centuries) in Termez city  - and Sultan Sadat is Sayyid Ali Akbar al Termizi, which is also mentioned with the nickname (kunyat) Sayyid Abu Muhammad who presumably died at the end of the 9th century or early 10th century in Termez. Many tombs and nameless graves of more than a thousand sayyids are located in the "Sultan Saodat" memorial complex and its territory in Termez.

List of notable descendants 
 Bahauddin Naqshband
 Hazrat Ishaan
 Moinuddin Hadi Naqshband
 Sayyid Mir Jan
 Sayyid Mahmud Agha
 Sayyid Mir Fazlullah Agha
 Sayyid Sultan Masood Dakik
 Emir Sultan Shamsuddin Bukhari
 Ishan Imlo
 Ajall Shams al-Din Omar
 Tajuddin Muhammad Badruddin
 Pir Baba
 Qozi Sayyid Bahodirxon
 Shaal Pir Baba
 Maudood Chishti
 Ahmed Badawi
 Wali Kirani
 Khwaja Abdullah Chishti
 Ibrahim Yukpasi
 Salih al-Ja'fari
 Jamāl al-Dīn al-Afghānī
 Muhammad Mirgani
 Ali Mirgani
 Muhammad Usman Mirgani
 Mohammed Uthman al-Mirghani al-Khatim
 Ahmed al-Mirghani
 Shah Sayyid Nasruddin

See also 
 Descendants of Ali ibn Abi Talib
 Twelve Imams
 Imamate (Twelver doctrine)
 Ahl Al-Bayt
 Sayyid

References 

9th-century births
Family of Muhammad
Husaynids
9th-century Muslim theologians
Sufi saints
Year of death unknown
9th-century Arabs